Anna Payr (born 23 March 1981) is a Hungarian sailor. She competed in the women's 470 event at the 2004 Summer Olympics.

References

External links
 

1981 births
Living people
Hungarian female sailors (sport)
Olympic sailors of Hungary
Sailors at the 2004 Summer Olympics – 470
Sportspeople from Budapest